The 2007 French Open (Roland Garros) was held in Paris, France from 27 May through to 10 June 2007. Rafael Nadal became the first man to win the tournament 3 times consecutively since Björn Borg, 1978–81; and maintained his unbeaten run at Roland Garros. Justine Henin also equaled Monica Seles' record of three consecutive wins. This was the third straight year that Rafael Nadal and Justine Henin won the French Open singles titles.

Timeline

Notable stories

Day-by-day summaries

Day 1
Most of the day's matches were canceled due to rain. Serena Williams and Justine Henin both won on the women's side. Marat Safin won his match, and was the 2007 French Open's first victor. Other winners include Dinara Safina, Tamira Paszek, Potito Starace and Janko Tipsarević.

Day 2
Most of the day was again canceled due to rain. However, Venus Williams, Michaëlla Krajicek and Nikolay Davydenko were amongst that day's winners.

Day 3
The third day saw almost the entire men's draw completed, with only seven of 64 matches yet to play. The top half of the women's singles draw also completed their action. The Americans struggled; only two of the eleven Americans in action are still in the tournament, one of nine men and one of two women. The only American woman to advance was Shenay Perry, who survived a loss of the first set against Olivia Sanchez. The other American man still in the tournament was Robby Ginepri, who didn't even advance yet. He split sets with Diego Hartfield before play was suspended. Spanish players enjoyed the opposite fortune, with six of eight men and the only woman all winning their matches. Ernests Gulbis, who became the first Latvian man in the main draw of a Grand Slam, saw off Britain's only representative, Tim Henman.

The longest match of the men's singles draw was Philipp Kohlschreiber's clash with Lukáš Dlouhý where the fifth set was eventually taken by Kohlschreiber, 17–15. Eight male seeds left the tournament:

Andy Roddick (3) lost 6–3, 4–6, 3–6, 4–6 to Igor Andreev.
Fernando González (5) lost 2–6, 2–6, 4–6 to former top ten player Radek Štěpánek.
James Blake (8) lost 6–4, 4–6, 5–7, 5–7 to Ivo Karlović.
Dominik Hrbatý (24) lost 2–6, 7–5, 7–6(3), 4–6, 3–6 to Czech qualifier Bohdan Ulihrach.
Robin Söderling (25) retired after being a set and 1–4 down in the second set to Albert Montañés.
Agustín Calleri (26) lost in four sets to lucky loser Mariano Zabaleta 4–6, 7–6(5), 6–7(5), 5–7.
Julien Benneteau (30) lost in four to Carlos Berlocq.
Florian Mayer (31) lost to Paul-Henri Mathieu in straight sets.

Also, the injured Russian eleventh seed Nadia Petrova went out 5–7, 7–5, 0–6 to Květa Peschke. Nicole Vaidišová and Jelena Janković defeated their opponents in straight sets.

Day 4
Tenth seed Tomáš Berdych failed to turn his overnight two-set deficit against Guillermo García López, and became the ninth men's seed to bow out in the first round. The conqueror of Fernando González, Radek Štěpánek, lost in five sets to wildcard Édouard Roger-Vasselin in the second round. Justine Henin, Serena Williams, Venus Williams, Maria Sharapova and Amélie Mauresmo won through as well. The unseeded Kristof Vliegen was able to beat eleventh seed Richard Gasquet in straight sets, 7–6(4), 6–3, 6–1.

Day 5
Gastón Gaudio, the 2004 champion, was up 6–4, 6–3 on fourteenth-seeded and former number one Lleyton Hewitt, but ended up losing the match in five sets. Hewitt came from behind two sets to defeat Gaudio. Also, Maria Sharapova, Rafael Nadal, Serena Williams and other players advanced, however rain once again stopped play around 6 P.M. Andreea Ehritt-Vanc and Anastasia Rodionova were amongst the first to win their doubles match today.

Day 6
On Day 6, a repeat of last year's mixed doubles final came when Katarina Srebotnik and Nenad Zimonjić beat Elena Likhovtseva and Daniel Nestor 6–2, 5–7, 10–7 in the first round. Number four seed Jelena Janković beat Venus Williams 6–4, 4–6, 6–1 in the third round. Filippo Volandri, seeded 29th, then the most recent person who defeated Roger Federer (at the 2007 Rome Masters), upset the 7th seed Ivan Ljubičić 6–4, 6–7, 4–6, 6–3, 6–4 in the third round, and he will play Tommy Robredo in the fourth round, which is his best French Open of his career.

Day 7
On Day 7, there was no rain delay. According to coverage on NBC, a game in the first set between Rafael Nadal and Albert Montañés went to over ten deuces, and thirty two points. Today, number five seed Amélie Mauresmo lost to Lucie Šafářová for the second time at a major in a row.

Day 8
On Day 8, the women's quarterfinal draw took shape. Two men's quarterfinals also took shape, and many matches in doubles and juniors were also played. The four women's quarterfinals are:

World number 1 Justine Henin against Serena Williams.
Jelena Janković against Nicole Vaidišová.
Ana Ivanovic against Svetlana Kuznetsova.
Anna Chakvetadze against Maria Sharapova, who survived two match points to win 3–6, 6–4, 9–7 over Patty Schnyder, shown on NBC.

The men's quarterfinals that have been formed by winning their fourth round matches are:
Roger Federer against Tommy Robredo
Guillermo Cañas against Nikolay Davydenko.

Day 9
The last two men's quarterfinals were formed. Junior singles and doubles matches as well as other senior doubles matches were played. The men's quarterfinals are as so:

Roger Federer (who beat Mikhail Youzhny) against Tommy Robredo (who beat Filippo Volandri)
Guillermo Cañas (who beat Juan Mónaco) against Nikolay Davydenko (who beat David Nalbandian)
Igor Andreev (who upset Marcos Baghdatis) against Novak Djokovic (who beat Fernando Verdasco)
Carlos Moyá (who beat Jonas Björkman) against Rafael Nadal (who beat Lleyton Hewitt).

Day 10
In the men's singles quarterfinals, Roger Federer beat Tommy Robredo, and Nikolay Davydenko beat Guillermo Cañas. Federer will meet Davydenko in the semifinals.

Day 11
The last men's semifinal was formed. Novak Djokovic beat Igor Andreev, and Rafael Nadal beat Carlos Moyá, and these two winners would take each other on in the semifinals.

Day 12
In the women's semifinals Ana Ivanovic beat Maria Sharapova 6–1, 6–2 to make it to her first Grand Slam singles final and Justine Henin beat Jelena Janković, and still hasn't lost a set in over two years at the French Open. The first champions were Nathalie Dechy and Andy Ram after finals victory over the 2006 champions Katarina Srebotnik and Nenad Zimonjić in mixed doubles.

Day 13
Finalists of men's singles are Roger Federer (who beat Nikolay Davydenko 7–5, 7–6, 7–6) and Rafael Nadal (who beat Novak Djokovic 7–5, 6–4, 6–2). 17th seeded Alicia Molik and Mara Santangelo beat Katarina Srebotnik and Ai Sugiyama, the seventh seeds, to win the women's doubles championship.

Day 14
Justine Henin beat Ana Ivanovic in straight sets, and is the three-time champion who has not lost a set since the 2005 fourth round when she saved match points against Svetlana Kuznetsova. The men's doubles and juniors doubles finals were played.

Day 15
Rafael Nadal defeated Roger Federer in 4 sets to win his 3rd straight French Open title. Nadal has now won 3 French Opens. He won all of twenty-one matches playing on Roland Garros. This was also the second consecutive year that Nadal denied Federer winning 4 slams in a row.

Seniors

Men's singles

 Rafael Nadal defeated  Roger Federer, 6–3, 4–6, 6–3, 6–4
It was Nadal's 3rd career Grand Slam title, and his 3rd (consecutive) French Open title.

Women's singles

 Justine Henin defeated  Ana Ivanovic, 6–1, 6–2
It was Henin's 4th title of the year, and her 33rd overall. It was her 6th career Grand Slam title, and her 4th and last French Open title.

Men's doubles

 Mark Knowles /  Daniel Nestor defeated  Lukáš Dlouhý /  Pavel Vízner, 2–6, 6–3, 6–4
It was Knowles' 3rd and last career Grand Slam title, and his only French Open title.
It was Nestor's 3rd career Grand Slam title, and his first French Open title.

Women's doubles

 Alicia Molik /  Mara Santangelo defeated  Katarina Srebotnik /  Ai Sugiyama, 7–6(7–5), 6–4
It was Molik's 2nd and last career Grand Slam title, and her only French Open title.
It was Santangelo's 1st and only career Grand Slam title.

Mixed doubles

 Nathalie Dechy /  Andy Ram defeated  Katarina Srebotnik /  Nenad Zimonjić, 7–5, 6–3

Juniors

Boys' singles

 Vladimir Ignatic defeated  Greg Jones 6–3, 6–4

Girls' singles

 Alizé Cornet defeated  Mariana Duque Marino 4–6, 6–1, 6–0

Boys' doubles

 Thomas Fabbiano /  Andrei Karatchenia defeated  Kellen Damico /  Jonathan Eysseric 6–4, 6–0

Girls' doubles

 Ksenia Milevskaya /  Urszula Radwańska  defeated  Sorana Cîrstea /  Alexa Glatch 6–1, 6–4

Legends

Legends under 45 doubles
 Arnaud Boetsch /  Guy Forget defeated  Henri Leconte /  Cédric Pioline 6–3, 3–6, 1–0(14)

Legends over 45 doubles
 Anders Järryd /  John McEnroe defeated  John Fitzgerald /  Guillermo Vilas 6–1, 6–2

Wheelchair

Wheelchair men's singles
 Shingo Kunieda defeated  Robin Ammerlaan 6–3, 6–4

Wheelchair women's singles
 Esther Vergeer defeated  Florence Gravellier 6–3, 5–7, 6–2

Wheelchair men's doubles
 Stéphane Houdet /  Michaël Jérémiasz defeated  Shingo Kunieda /  Satoshi Saida 7–6(7–4), 6–1

Wheelchair women's doubles
 Maaike Smit /  Esther Vergeer defeated  Florence Gravellier /  Mie Yaosa 6–1, 6–4

Seeds
The seeded players are listed below. Players in bold are still in the competition. The players no longer in the tournament are listed with the round in which they exited.

Men's singles
 Roger Federer (final, lost to Rafael Nadal)
 Rafael Nadal  (champion)
 Andy Roddick, (first round, lost to Igor Andreev)
 Nikolay Davydenko, (semifinals, lost to Roger Federer)
 Fernando González, (first round, lost to Radek Štěpánek)
 Novak Djokovic, (semifinals, lost to Rafael Nadal)
 Ivan Ljubičić, (third round, lost to Filippo Volandri)
 James Blake, (first round, lost to Ivo Karlović)
 Tommy Robredo, (quarterfinals, lost to Roger Federer)
 Tomáš Berdych, (first round, lost to Guillermo García López)
 Richard Gasquet, (second round, lost to Kristof Vliegen)
 David Ferrer, (third round, lost to Fernando Verdasco)
 Mikhail Youzhny, (fourth round, lost to Roger Federer)
 Lleyton Hewitt, (fourth round, lost to Rafael Nadal)
 David Nalbandian, (fourth round, lost to Nikolay Davydenko)
 Marcos Baghdatis, (fourth round, lost to Igor Andreev)
 Juan Carlos Ferrero, (third round, lost to Mikhail Youzhny)
 Juan Ignacio Chela, (second round, lost to Gaël Monfils)
 Guillermo Cañas, (quarterfinals, lost to Nikolay Davydenko)
 Jarkko Nieminen, (third round, lost to Lleyton Hewitt)
 Dmitry Tursunov, (second round, lost to Fernando Verdasco)
 Marat Safin, (second round, lost to Janko Tipsarević)
 Carlos Moyá, (quarterfinals, lost to Rafael Nadal)
 Dominik Hrbatý, (first round, lost to Bohdan Ulihrach)
 Robin Söderling, (first round, lost to Albert Montañés)
 Agustín Calleri, (first round, lost to Mariano Zabaleta)
 Jürgen Melzer, (second round, lost to Juan Mónaco)
 Philipp Kohlschreiber, (second round, lost to Óscar Hernández)
 Filippo Volandri, (fourth round, lost to Tommy Robredo)
 Julien Benneteau, (first round, lost to Carlos Berlocq)
 Florian Mayer, (first round, lost to Paul-Henri Mathieu)
 Nicolás Almagro, (second round, lost to Michaël Llodra)

Women's singles
 Justine Henin (champion)
 Maria Sharapova, (semifinals, lost to  Ana Ivanovic)
 Svetlana Kuznetsova, (quarterfinals, lost to  Ana Ivanovic)
 Jelena Janković, (semifinals, lost to Justine Henin)
 Amélie Mauresmo, (third round, lost to Lucie Šafářová)
 Nicole Vaidišová, (quarterfinals, lost to  Jelena Janković)
 Ana Ivanovic (final, lost to Justine Henin)
 Serena Williams, (quarterfinals, lost to  Justine Henin)
 Anna Chakvetadze, (quarterfinals, lost to  Maria Sharapova)
 Dinara Safina, (fourth round, lost to Serena Williams)
 Nadia Petrova, (first round, lost to Květa Peschke)
 Daniela Hantuchová, (third round, lost to Anabel Medina Garrigues)
 Elena Dementieva, (third round, lost to Marion Bartoli)
 Patty Schnyder, (fourth round, lost to Maria Sharapova)
 Shahar Pe'er, (fourth round, lost to Svetlana Kuznetsova)
 Li Na, (third round, lost to Sybille Bammer)
 Katarina Srebotnik, (third round, lost to Shahar Pe'er)
 Marion Bartoli, (fourth round, lost to Jelena Janković)
 Tathiana Garbin, (fourth round, lost to Nicole Vaidišová)
 Sybille Bammer, (fourth round, lost to Justine Henin)
 Ai Sugiyama, (third round, lost to Anna Chakvetadze)
 Alona Bondarenko, (second round, lost to Karin Knapp)
 Francesca Schiavone, (third round, lost to Dinara Safina)
 Anabel Medina Garrigues, (fourth round, lost to Ana Ivanovic)
 Lucie Šafářová, (fourth round, lost to Anna Chakvetadze)
 Venus Williams, (third round, lost to Jelena Janković)
 Samantha Stosur, (second round, lost to Milagros Sequera)
 Mara Santangelo, (third round, lost to Justine Henin)
 Gisela Dulko, (second round, lost to Alla Kudryavtseva)
 Julia Vakulenko, (first round, lost to Ioana Raluca Olaru)
 Séverine Brémond, (first round, lost to Michaëlla Krajicek)
 Martina Müller, (second round, lost to Dominika Cibulková)

Qualifier entries

Men's qualifiers entries

  Marcos Daniel
  Konstantinos Economidis
  Lukáš Dlouhý
  Flavio Cipolla
  Iván Navarro
  Fabio Fognini
  Laurent Recouderc
  Juan Pablo Brzezicki
  Boris Pašanski
  Marin Čilić
  Jérôme Haehnel
  Paul Capdeville
  Christophe Rochus
  Ivo Minář
  Bohdan Ulihrach
  Dušan Vemić

The following players received entry into a lucky loser spot:
  Mariano Zabaleta
  Juan Pablo Guzmán
  Santiago Giraldo
  Fernando Vicente

Women's qualifiers entries

  Mariya Koryttseva
  Květa Peschke
  Ágnes Szávay
  Alla Kudryavtseva
  Akgul Amanmuradova
  Hsieh Su-wei
  Rossana de los Ríos
  Timea Bacsinszky
  Andrea Petkovic
  Olga Savchuk
  Raluca Olaru
  Dominika Cibulková

The following players received entry into a lucky loser spot:
  Sofia Arvidsson
  Emma Laine

Protected ranking
The following players were accepted directly into the main draw using a protected ranking: 

Men's singles
  Igor Andreev
  Justin Gimelstob
  Victor Hănescu
  Martin Verkerk

Women's singles
  Nuria Llagostera Vives

Withdrawn players

Men's singles
Before the tournament
 Mario Ančić → replaced by  Stefano Galvani
 Mardy Fish → replaced by  Santiago Giraldo
 Tommy Haas → replaced by  Juan Pablo Guzmán
 Nicolas Kiefer → replaced by  Chris Guccione
 Evgeny Korolev → replaced by  Fernando Vicente
 Xavier Malisse → replaced by  Simone Bolelli
 Alberto Martín → replaced by  Nicolas Devilder
 Andy Murray → replaced by  Mariano Zabaleta
 Paradorn Srichaphan → replaced by  Andreas Seppi

During the tournament
 Jan Hernych

Women's singles
Before the tournament
 Tatiana Golovin → replaced by  Sofia Arvidsson
 Martina Hingis → replaced by  Emmanuelle Gagliardi
 Evgenia Linetskaya → replaced by  Caroline Wozniacki
 Peng Shuai → replaced by  Angelique Kerber
 Karolina Šprem → replaced by  Emma Laine
 Vera Zvonareva → replaced by  Yuliya Beygelzimer

Media coverage
Coverage of the 2007 French Open was as follows:
Arab World – Al Jazeera Sports
Europe – Eurosport
Latin America – ESPN International
South-East Asia – Star Sports
Belgium – Sporza, VRT, RTBF
Brazil – ESPN Brasil
Croatia – HRT 2 (daily highlights and the singles finals live)
France – France Televisions
Great Britain – BBC Interactive (Women's Singles final on BBC 1, Men's Singles final live on interactive service; highlights on BBC 2)
 Ireland – TG4
 Japan – TV Tokyo, Wowow
Netherlands – NOS
Russia – Sport TV, NTV Plus
Serbia – RTS
United States – NBC, ESPN2, The Tennis Channel

See also

 2007 in tennis

References

 
May 2007 sports events in France
June 2007 sports events in France